Muharrem Uz (born 10 December 1980) is a footballer who plays as a midfielder for side Nigde Belediyespor.

Uz began his professional career by signing a one-year contract with TFF First League club Kayseri Erciyesspor in August 2001. Next, he would join Gaziantepspor and Malatyaspor, playing in a total of 23 Süper Lig matches for the clubs. He joined Kazakhstan Premier League side FC Zhetysu in March 2010, but would leave the club in July 2010.

References 

1980 births
Living people
Turkish footballers
Adana Demirspor footballers
Gaziantepspor footballers
Malatyaspor footballers
Elazığspor footballers
Sivasspor footballers
SV Yeşilyurt players

Association football midfielders